Ardagh Group is a Luxembourg-based producer of glass and metal products that has "grown in the past two decades into one of the world’s largest metal and glass packaging companies".

As of 2012, the company operated 89 facilities in 22 countries, employed approximately 23,500 people, and had approximately €7.7 billion in revenue.

History
Founded in 1932 as the Irish Glass Bottle Company in Dublin, the company expanded through a series of acquisitions after Paul Coulson acquired an initial stake in the company in 1998. In North America, the company currently operates two of the oldest continuously operated glass container plants in the country: Dunkirk, Indiana, opened in 1889, and Winchester, Indiana, opened in 1898.

It purchased Rockware Glass in 1999. In 2011, it purchased the metal packaging company Impress Group for €1.7 billion and Fi Par for €125 million. In August 2012, the company acquired Anchor Glass Container Corporation for $880 million. In January 2013, Ardagh Group agreed to acquire St-Gobain's Verallia North America for €1.3 billion. In 2012 it purchased the Rexam Glass Division.

The company launched an initial public offering (IPO) in March 2017 on the New York Stock Exchange, raising just over $300 million.

References

External links

 Ardagh Group official website

Glassmaking companies of Ireland
Packaging companies of Luxembourg
Companies based in Luxembourg City
Holding companies of Luxembourg
1932 establishments in Ireland
Manufacturing companies established in 1932
Irish brands